This is the complete list of Asian Games medalists in badminton from 1962 to 2018.

Events

Men's singles

Men's doubles

Men's team

Women's singles

Women's doubles

Women's team

Mixed doubles

References

BAC: Asian Games
Doha 2006: Medalists from previous Asian Games
Sports123: Asian Games badminton

Badminton
medalists

Asian Games